Cheitharol Kumbaba, also spelled Cheithalon Kumpapa, is the court chronicle of the kings of Manipur. 
The oldest extant version was copied in the early 19th century, under Jai Singh, the puppet king installed after the Burmese invasion, as "the former copy was no  more available".
It is the main source for the list of pre-modern kings of Manipur, tracing the genealogy of the ruling Ningthouja dynasty back to a ruler named Nongda Lairen Pakhangba, said to have ruled for more than a century, from  33–154 CE.
It is to the Meiteis what the Buranji is to the Assamese and the Yazawin to the Burmese.

Etymology
Ancient Meitei counting methods involved sticks (chei) being placed (thapa) to represent a base number. Kum signifies a period of time and paba is a verb meaning to read or reckon. The chronicle's title therefore connotes the "placing of sticks or using a base as a means of reckoning the period of time, the years" and is indicative of the Meitei approach to counting and recording.

Bengali versions
Cheitharol Kumbaba was transliterated to Bengali script by Pundit Thongam Madhob Singh and published by Vishvabharati Mandir . With Maharaja Churchand Singh's permission, the chronicle was edited by L. Ibungohal Singh and Pundit N. Khelchandra Singh and published by the Manipuri Sahitya Parishad in 1967; this edited version is the Hindu-oriented version. The Sanamahi followers (people of Kangleipak) do not want to consider the book edited by Khelchandra Singh as a final version as he added many words which are imported from Sanskrit and Hindi in his translation.

English versions
In 1891, Major Maxwell, the Political Agent of Manipur, instructed the court to translate the Cheitharol Kumbaba into English. The translation was carried out by a Bengali clerk named Mamacharan. It was edited and published by L. Joychandra Singh in 1995 under the title The Lost Kingdom.

A Meitei scholar, Saroj N. Arambam Parratt, produced another English version of the Chronicle under the title The Court Chronicle of the Kings of Manipur: Cheitharon Kumpapa in 2005. Parratt includes a facsimile of the original manuscript of the Cheitharol Kumbaba. The Cheitharol Kumbaba adopted three chronological systems or eras: Kalyabda, Saka era, Chandrabda or Kangleipak era. From 1666 CE onwards, days of the week are mentioned in the Cheitharol Kumbaba.

In 2010, Rajkumar Somorjit Sana produced an edited English version of the Cheitharol Kumbaba with the corresponding Western dates for each Meitei date under the title The Chronology of Meetei Monarchs (From 1666 CE to 1850 CE) (Imphal: Waikhom Ananda Meetei, 2010). In 2012, Mr. Nepram Bihari, a retired bureaucrat of Manipur made a definitive translation of Cheitharol Kumbaba into English. It is said that Mr. Bihari had to learn the ancient script of Meitei Mayek to make this translation, a major project that took him 17 years to finish.

See also
Kingdom of Pong
Meitei literature

Notes

References
 

History of Manipur
Indian chronicles
Puyas